Mohan Rajan is an Indian lyricist working on Tamil language films.

Career
Hailing from Valayapatti near Tiruchirappalli, Mohan Rajan arrived in Chennai in 2001, hoping to become a lyricist in the Tamil film industry. However, he failed to get a breakthrough and instead qualified himself by pursuing master's degree in Tamil literature and later media arts at Loyola College, Chennai. Mohan Rajan was launched as a lyricist by James Vasanthan during the making of Yathumaagi (2010). Soon after the release of the song, he became acquainted with Vasanthan's friend, the film-maker Sasikumar, who began to regularly hand lyric-writing assignments to Mohan for his projects. Notably, he wrote the song "Jilla Vittu" from Easan (2010) and then "Kondaadum Manasu" from Sundarapandian (2012) for Sasikumar's projects.

Mohan Rajan's breakthrough song was "Kanave Kanave", a pathos song featured in Bejoy Nambiar's anthology film David (2013), featuring Vikram and Jiiva. The song was composed and sung by Anirudh Ravichander. Since his breakthrough, he has worked on albums including Ilaiyaraaja's Tharai Thappattai (2016), the composer's thousandth album, which Bala chose him for after being impressed with his work in Chandi Veeran (2015). He later wrote popular songs such as "Yaanji Yaanji" in Vikram Vedha (2017), as well as songs in Kodiveeran (2017) and Padaiveeran (2018).

Filmography

References

Tamil film poets
Indian lyricists
Living people
1984 births